Theodore H. Kattouf (born 1946 Altoona, Pennsylvania) is an American diplomat.

Life
Kattouf graduated from the Pennsylvania State University in 1968. He served in the United States Army, attaining the rank of captain. 
He joined the Foreign Service in 1972.
In 1982–83, he  was a Department of State fellow at Princeton University.

He was Ambassador to the United Arab Emirates from 1999 to 2001. He was Ambassador to Syria from 2002 to 2003.

He is President and CEO of Amideast, beginning on September 2, 2003.

References

External links

"United States and Syria should talk (about everything)", Common Ground, 15 July 2008
Text: Ambassador-Designate To The UAE Kattouf's Senate Testimony

1946 births
People from Altoona, Pennsylvania
Pennsylvania State University alumni
Ambassadors of the United States to Syria
Ambassadors of the United States to the United Arab Emirates
Living people
United States Foreign Service personnel
American chief executives